Colony 7 is an arcade shoot 'em up developed and published by Taito's American division in 1981. It contains elements of both Space Invaders (developed by Taito of Japan) and Atari, Inc.'s Missile Command. Colony 7 was the inspiration for the successful Atari 2600 game Atlantis from Imagic.

The main innovation of Colony 7 was its extended weaponry arsenal. This gave the player the choice to change between several different weapons, with each one needing to be purchased separately as microtransactions through the arcade coin slot.

The game was re-released as part of Taito Legends.

References

External links

1981 video games
Arcade video games
Shoot 'em ups
Video games developed in the United States
Taito arcade games
Single-player video games